A gubernatorial election was held on 5 April 1947 to elect the Governor of Saga Prefecture. Former governor Gen'ichi Okimori defeated six other candidates to become the prefecture's first democratically elected governor.

Candidates
 - former Governor of Saga Prefecture (1945–1946), age 49
Baron  of the  - Member of the House of Peers, age 47
 - former Governor of Taipei (later Member of the House of Representatives), age 51
 - former Governor of Saga Prefecture (1946–1947), age 47
 - author with two works catalogued in the National Diet Library, age 40
, age 53
, age 42

Results

References

Saga gubernatorial elections
1947 elections in Japan